St. Rose Dominican Hospital – Siena Campus is a non-profit hospital owned and operated by Dignity Health and is located in Henderson, Nevada.

History
Siena Campus was the second St. Rose Dominican facility to open in Southern Nevada, bringing much-needed healthcare services to the growing Henderson area in 2000. The campus now serves as a hub for many of St. Rose Dominican's tertiary services.

Services and Features

 Opened in 2000
 326 beds
 
 Cardiology/Open Heart Surgery Center
 Chapel and chaplains
 Community Outreach Programs
 Da Vinci robotic surgical system 
 Emergency Department
 Get Well Network
 Healing Garden
 Home Health and Hospice services
 Intensive Care Unit
 Inpatient laboratory services
 In and out patient surgical and rehabilitative services
 Joint Replacement Center
 Level III Neonatal Intensive Care Unit (NICU)
 Level III Trauma Center
 Obstetrical services (Maternal Child Center)
 Oncology Unit
 Palliative Care
 Pediatric Unit, 24-hour emergency room and ICU 
 Radiology services, including digital diagnostic and neuro-interventional 
 Respiratory Therapy

See also
 St. Rose Dominican Hospital – Rose de Lima Campus
 St. Rose Dominican Hospital – San Martín Campus

References

External links
 

2000 establishments in Nevada
Dignity Health
Buildings and structures in Henderson, Nevada
Hospital buildings completed in 2000
Catholic hospitals in North America
Hospitals established in 2000
Hospitals in the Las Vegas Valley